Kalyanpar is a village located in the Morbi district in the Indian state of Gujarat, India. The village is 3 km from center Tankara. Many industries like Cotton Ginning factories, Cotton Seed oil Mills, Polypack etc are located here.

References

Villages in Morbi district